Counterfire is a Marxist and revolutionary socialist organisation in the United Kingdom. Founded in 2010, it runs a website and has published pamphlets under the Counterfire imprint. It has its origins in the Trotskyist political tradition.

History 
Counterfire was launched on International Women’s Day in 2010, following a split from the Socialist Workers Party. Counterfire has put emphasis on participation in social movements, notably the Coalition of Resistance, the People’s Assembly Against Austerity and Stop the War Coalition.

A number of Counterfire members, including Lindsey German, John Rees and Chris Nineham, have played prominent roles in the Stop the War Coalition, both before and after the formation of Counterfire. In 2010, Counterfire was instrumental in establishing a new campaigning organisation, Coalition of Resistance, to oppose the Conservative-led government’s austerity programme, following a call by Tony Benn. In 2013, this was supplanted by the People’s Assembly Against Austerity, which Counterfire has continued to actively promote.

Political views and activity 
Counterfire was supportive of the Arab spring uprisings in 2011. As part of the Stop the War Coalition, it opposed subsequent military interventions involving the UK in Libya and Syria.

Between 2012 and 2013, Counterfire ran a left-wing café in London called Firebox, where it hosted political events aimed at building socialist ideas. It also organised political theory and organising events including citizen activism day schools.

Counterfire was strongly supportive of Jeremy Corbyn’s leadership of the Labour Party (2015–19) but maintained an independent organisation and publications, rather than joining the Labour Party. The organisation defended Corbyn against accusations of antisemitism and in 2018 opposed the Labour Party national executive’s adoption of the IHRA definition of antisemitism, arguing that it was part of the weaponising of antisemitism for political ends.

In 2014, Counterfire advocated voting Yes in the referendum on Scottish independence and supported the left-wing Radical Independence Campaign.

In 2016, the organisation argued for voting Leave in the referendum on UK membership of the European Union on a socialist, democratic and anti-racist basis.

At the People’s Assembly Against Austerity protest outside the Conservative Party Conference in 2017, Counterfire activist Shabbir Lakha confronted Jacob-Rees Mogg, who was then being touted as a potential next leader of the party, over his support for austerity.

Counterfire members in the Stop the War Coalition and People’s Assembly Against Austerity played prominent roles in organising the demonstration against Donald Trump’s State Visit to the UK in 2019 where an estimated 250,000 people marched through London against the US President.

Counterfire supported the Clapham Common vigil for Sarah Everard in March 2021, where they interviewed Patsy Stevenson after she was aggressively arrested by the Metropolitan Police.

Publications 
Counterfire publishes a free monthly newspaper as well as two weekly email bulletins: Lindsey German’s Weekly Briefing and News from the Frontline. Through its publishing imprint, Counterfire has produced several books:

References 

Trotskyist organisations in the United Kingdom
2010 establishments in the United Kingdom